Des fleurs pour un caméléon is Belgian pop singer Lio's fifth studio album of entirely new material and sixth album overall. It was produced by French singer Etienne Daho and was released in 1991. The lead single of the album is a cover of Antônio Carlos Jobim's "The Girl From Ipanema".

Singles

Re-issues
The album was originally released by the record company Polydor in 1991. It was re-released by Ze Records in 2005 with five bonus tracks, including the radio versions of the singles.

Track listing

Personnel
 Backing vocals – C.C Sisters, The, Helena Noguerra, Lio, Nicholas West
 Bass – Marcel Aubé
 Drums, percussion – Chuck Sabo
 Engineer [assistant in London] – David Browne, John McDonnel*, Ron Aslan
 Engineer [assistant in Paris] – Emmanuelle Ancla, Etienne De Crécy
 Guitar – Jérôme Soligny, Xavier Geronimi
 Harmonica – Elliott Murphy
 Keyboards – David Munday, Jérôme Soligny
 Mastered by – Tony Cousins
 Mixed by – Roland Herrington
 Piano – Helen Turner
 Producer, arranged by – Etienne Daho
 Programmed by – Andy Whytmore*, Chuck Sabo, Gota*
 Reissue producer – Michel Esteban
 Remastered by – Charlus de la Salle
 Saxophone [alto & baritone], Flute – Simon Clarke
 Saxophone [tenor] – Tim Sanders
 Trumpet – Roddy Lorimer

References

1991 albums
Lio albums
Polydor Records albums
ZE Records albums